WKMM (96.7 FM) is a country formatted broadcast radio station licensed to Kingwood, West Virginia, serving Kingwood and Preston County, West Virginia.  WKMM is owned and operated by Neil P. Waldeck.

History
Founded by Sandy Sue Garlitz, WKMM launched on December 2, 1987, and has always had a country format.  It was the first FM band station in Preston County.

WKMM had previously went by the branding "96-7 KMM" until 2005, when it began using the "K-Country" moniker.  Also in 2005, WKMM began using "StormTracker 12" weather reports over the air from local NBC affiliate, WBOY-TV in nearby Clarksburg.

In December 2009, WKMM became Preston County, West Virginia's first radio station to broadcast live online.

In late 2010, WKMM dropped weather reports from WBOY and began using AccuWeather radio reports, branded as "SkySource Weather".

Ownership/technical
WKMM is owned by Reedsville businessman Neil P. Waldeck.  From 1992 until 2005, WKMM was owned by Kingwood businessman P.J. Crogan.  Studios are located on Main Street in Kingwood with their transmitter along West Virginia Route 7 near Terra Alta, West Virginia.

See also
 WKMM's Studios on Google StreetView
 WKMM's Tower on Google StreetView

References

External links

 
 

KMM
Country radio stations in the United States